Roundtop was an unincorporated community in Morgan County, West Virginia, United States.

References

Unincorporated communities in Morgan County, West Virginia
Unincorporated communities in West Virginia
West Virginia populated places on the Potomac River